The Consularia Italica are a collection of consular fasti published in 1892 by Theodore Mommsen as part of the 'Monumenta Germaniae Historica'. They are composed of:

 Anonymi valesiani pars posterior
 Fasti vindobonenses priores
 Fasti vindobonenses posteriores
 Paschale campanum
 Continuatio hauniensis Prosperi
 Excerpta ex Barbaro Scaligeri
 Excerpta ex Agnelli Libro pontificali ecclesiae ravennati

1892 books
Documents